I Believe! is a 2009 Russian drama film directed by Lidia Bobrova.

Plot 
The film tells the story of an unbelieving alcoholic man who has embarked on a path of spiritual rebirth.

Cast 
 Aleksandr Aravushkin as Maksim
 Veronika Babichuk as Nastya
 Aleksandr Fyodorov as Teacher
 Yuriy Katchalov as Policeman
 Sasha Kozlov as Valerka
 Irina Osnovina as Ludmila
 Tatyana Smirnova
 Vera Smolina
 Fyodor Yasnikov as Priest
 Yury Zhigarkov as Sanya

References

External links 
 

2009 films
2000s Russian-language films
Russian drama films
Films about Orthodoxy
2009 drama films